Juliette Lesley Hohnen (born in London, UK) is an American on-air personality.

Biography
She worked for MTV Europe before moving to the United States as a producer and on-air reporter for MTV's Big Picture movie program. In the 1990s, she was the Los Angeles bureau chief for MTV News. She later worked at a UK version of Entertainment Tonight  and a similar program for Turner Network Television. She also has written for magazines including Harpers and Queen and Tatler. As of March 2021, she is currently a realtor in Los Angeles.

She became engaged to actor Steven Weber in 1995, and the two married on July 29 that year at Highclere Castle in Hampshire, England. She was 30 at the time of this marriage, her first. On February 6, 2013, she filed for divorce from Weber, with whom she has two sons: Jack Alexander Hohnen-Weber, born January 15, 2001, in Santa Monica, California, and Alfie James born February 25, 2003.

References

External links

Living people
American women journalists
Journalists from London
Year of birth missing (living people)
21st-century American women